The Marrow of Modern Divinity was a book written in 1645 by Edward Fisher and later reprinted with the notes of Thomas Boston, the book ignited the Marrow controversy.  The book is divided into three sections which are called "The Law of Works, The Law of Faith and The Law of Christ" is a dialogue with four characters, which are: an antinomian, a legalist, a minister of the gospel and a new Christian. Fisher attempts by using the dialogue of these characters to describe the gospel from errors. The book is centered around the law-gospel distinction.

See also 
Auchterarder Creed

References

External links
 

17th-century books